Hell-Fire Austin is a 1932 American Pre-Code film directed by Forrest Sheldon.

Cast
Ken Maynard as Ken "Hell-Fire" Austin
Ivy Merton as Judy Brooks
Nat Pendleton as Bouncer O'Brien
Alan Roscoe as Mark Edmonds
Jack Perrin as Curley
Lafe McKee as Uncle Joe Brooks
Charles Le Moyne as Sheriff
Tarzan, the Wonder Horse as Tarzan (Judy's horse)

Plot
Expert horseman Austin and O'Brien are in prison when Brooks announces that she plans to run Tarzan (a champion horse) in an upcoming race. Rancher Edmonds attempts to thwart Brooks's plans by getting Austin released from prison to ride another horse to victory. After his release, Austin changes his plans and rides Tarzan in the race.

Soundtrack
 Jack Kirk, Chuck Baldra and other soldiers - "My Buddy" (Music by Walter Donaldson, lyrics by Gus Kahn)
 Jack Kirk, Chuck Baldra and other Riders - "When the Bloom Is on the Sage (Round-Up Time in Texas)" (composed by Fred Howard and Nat Vincent)

References

External links

1932 films
1932 Western (genre) films
American black-and-white films
American Western (genre) films
Tiffany Pictures films
1930s English-language films
1930s American films